Luigi Bertolini (13 September 1904  – 11 February 1977) was an Italian footballer who played as a midfielder.

Club career
Born in Busalla, province of Genoa, Bertolini played in the 1920s for Savona, Alessandria and Juventus. He moved from Alessandria to Juventus in 1931, becoming an integral part of the remainder of their five-year championship run. In total, he played 135 matches for Juventus, scoring five goals, helping the team to win four Serie A tournaments. He retired from playing football in 1940.

International career
With the Italy national football team, Bertolini made his debut in 1929, and was a member of the teams that was runner-up at the 1931-32 Central European International Cup & winner at the 1933–35 Central European International Cup but most notably he was also a member of the team that won the 1934 FIFA World Cup. Alongside Luisito Monti and Attilio Ferraris, Luigi Bertolini made up the legendary Italian midfield established at the 1934 World Cup. In that tournament he started every game and was only rested by Pozzo in the first quarter-final encounter against Spain. Bertolini is very recognisable in the photos of the 1934 Italian World Cup-winning team by virtue of his big white bandana which he used to protect his head from the seams of the ball when attempting headers. He was also one of the 'Lions of Highbury' in the narrow loss to England in November 1934 known as the Battle of Highbury. As the story goes, during the second half he was disoriented from fatigue and with the English constantly in attack, he kept calling out for Luisito not realising that Monti was not on the field (due to a broken bone) and the midline was just himself and Ferraris.

Managerial career
Following his retirement, Bertolini began his coaching career with Tigullia in 1938.

Honours

Club
Juventus
Serie A: 1931–32, 1932–33, 1933–34, 1934–35

Tigullia
Prima Divisione: 1937–38

International 
Italy
 FIFA World Cup: 1934
 Central European International Cup: 1933-35
 Central European International Cup: Runner-up: 1931-32

References
 La Gazzetta dello Sport

1904 births
1977 deaths
Sportspeople from the Province of Genoa
Italian footballers
Italy international footballers
Association football midfielders
Serie A players
U.S. Alessandria Calcio 1912 players
Juventus F.C. players
Juventus F.C. managers
Serie A managers
1934 FIFA World Cup players
FIFA World Cup-winning players
Brescia Calcio managers
A.C. Cuneo 1905 managers
Italian football managers
Footballers from Liguria
20th-century Italian people